Montagu is a mid-market private equity firm with a specialism in carve-out transactions and other first-time buyout investments. Montagu partners with companies with multi-million dollar enterprise values. Headquartered in London, Montagu also has offices in Paris, Frankfurt, Warsaw and Luxembourg.

History
The firm was founded in 1968 as a division of Midland Bank after Midland's acquisition of Montagu Trust, owner of Samuel Montagu & Co.  The business was renamed HSBC Private Equity after HSBC acquired Midland Bank in 1992 and the Montagu name was revived when Montagu's management team acquired 80.1% of Montagu shares from HSBC in 2003.

In 2013, the team purchased the remaining 19.9% from HSBC.

Investments
The primary investment focus of Montagu is on management buyouts of performing businesses with enterprise values typically ranging from €200 million to €1 billion.

References 

Private equity firms of the United Kingdom
Companies based in the London Borough of Southwark